WLVL (1340 AM) is a radio station  broadcasting a News Talk Information format. Licensed to Lockport, New York, United States, the station serves the Buffalo-Niagara Falls area.  The station is currently owned by Bill Yuhnke, who also owns WEBR in Niagara Falls.

History

WLVL went on the air in 1949 as WUSJ, owned by the Lockport Union-Sun and Journal, Inc., the local newspaper that owned it until 1990. The station was sold to Hall Communications in 1970 and became WLVL in 1975.

For most of the 21st century, WLVL was owned by Dick Greene, through his holding company Culver Communications. In September 2022, WLVL owner Dick Greene announced his retirement and the sale of the station to Bill Yuhnke, who owns WEBR and Liberty Yellow Cab, a taxicab service in the Buffalo region. Yuhnke plans no changes to the station's format or staff. Yuhnke's purchase of WLVL closed in January 2023.

Programming
WLVL offers a morning drive time talk show hosted by John Maser with Hank Nevins (a frequent on-again off-again contributor to WLVL over the decades) as newsman, a tradio program, a "Dial-a-Deal" program in which listeners can buy gift certificates at discount prices, and a weekly sports talk program devoted to Niagara County sports teams. The station is affiliated with Premiere Networks, carrying the Glenn Beck Program, The Clay Travis and Buck Sexton Show, The Sean Hannity Show and Fox Sports Radio; it also carries affiliations with Fox News Radio, The Ramsey Show, Doug Stephan and Bill O'Reilly.

Sports on WLVL include the Niagara Power collegiate summer baseball squad and local high school sports. It is an affiliate of the New York Yankees Radio Network.

Alumni
Frank Arlington (a.k.a. Frank Williams), who spent over 30 years as a sportscaster for WESB, was a member of WLVL's staff in the early 1980s.
Brian Kahle, former AM Buffalo host, hosted a talk show on WLVL from 2007 until his death in 2013.
Tom Jolls, longtime Buffalo television personality, began his career at what was then WUSJ and had an 11-year run at the station, 1951–62.
National talk show host Stephanie Miller started at WLVL before leaving for Rochester's WCMF.
John Murphy, the Voice of the Buffalo Bills and a Lockport native, started at WLVL, handling play-by-play of Niagara-Orleans League games.
Doug Young, a radio veteran of WGR and the now-defunct WNSA, hosted an interview program on WLVL, but was fired in September 2008.

References

External links

Radio Locator Information on W287CV

LVL
Radio stations established in 2008